Saša Jovanović (Serbian Cyrillic: Саша Јовановић; born 18 June 1974) is a Serbian football manager and former striker. Jovanović also has Cypriot citizenship.

As a player, he played for FK Radnički Niš, Anorthosis, APOP Paphos, AEL Limassol, Trikala, Panionios, AEP Paphos and APOEL.

External links
 Personal Website
 Profile at pafosfc.com

1974 births
Living people
Sportspeople from Leskovac
Serbian footballers
Serbian expatriate footballers
Association football forwards
FK Radnički Niš players
Anorthosis Famagusta F.C. players
AEP Paphos FC players
Panionios F.C. players
Trikala F.C. players
AEL Limassol players
APOEL FC players
Super League Greece players
Cypriot First Division players
Expatriate footballers in Cyprus
Expatriate footballers in Greece
Olympiakos Nicosia managers
AEP Paphos FC managers
Enosis Neon Paralimni FC managers
APEP FC managers
Serbian football managers
Expatriate football managers in Cyprus
APOP Paphos FC players
Akritas Chlorakas players
Akritas Chlorakas managers